Krupp armour was a type of steel naval armour used in the construction of capital ships starting shortly before the end of the nineteenth century.  It was developed by Germany's Krupp Arms Works in 1893 and quickly replaced Harvey armour as the primary method of protecting naval ships, before itself being supplanted by the improved Krupp cemented armour.

Original Krupp armour
The initial manufacturing of Krupp armour was very similar to Harveyized armour; however, while the Harvey process generally used nickel-steel, the Krupp process added as much as 1% chromium to the alloy for additional hardness.  Also, while Harveyized armour was carburized by heating the steel and placing charcoal on its surface for long periods (often several weeks), Krupp armour went a step further.  Instead of inefficiently introducing carbon at the surface with coal, Krupp armour achieved greater depth of carbon cementation by applying carbon-bearing gases (coal gas or acetylene) to the heated steel.  Once the carburization process was complete, the metal was then transformed into face hardened steel by rapidly heating the cemented face, allowing the high heat to penetrate 30% to 40% of the steel's depth, then quickly quenching first the superheated side then both sides of the steel with powerful jets of either water or oil.

Krupp armour was swiftly adopted by the world's major navies; ballistic tests showed that 10.2 inches (25.9 cm) of Krupp armour offered the same protection as 12 inches (30.4 cm) of Harvey armour.

Krupp cemented armour
By the early twentieth century, Krupp armour was rendered obsolete by the development of Krupp cemented armour (also "Krupp cemented steel", "K.C. armor" or "KCA"), an evolved variant of Krupp armour. The manufacturing process remained largely the same, with slight changes in the alloy composition: in % of total – carbon 0.35, nickel 3.90, chromium 2.00, manganese 0.35, silicon 0.07, phosphorus 0.025, sulfur 0.020.

KCA retained the hardened face of Krupp armour via the application of carbonized gases but also retained a much greater fibrous elasticity on the rear of the plate.  This increased elasticity greatly reduced the incidence of spalling and cracking under incoming fire, a valuable quality during long engagements.  Ballistic testing shows that KCA and Krupp armour were roughly equal in other respects.

Homogeneous Krupp-type armour
Developments in face-hardened armour in the late nineteenth and early to mid-twentieth centuries revealed that such armour was less effective against glancing oblique impacts. The hardened face layer's brittleness was counterproductive against such impacts. Consequently, alongside face hardened armour such as KCA, homogeneous armour types that combined ductility and tensile strength were developed to protect against glancing impacts.

Examples of such armour include German Wotan weich (Ww) and US special treatment steel (STS) and Class B homogeneous armour.

References

Bibliography
 
 

 

Naval armour
Krupp